Lac-Saint-Jean-Est is a regional county municipality in the Saguenay–Lac-Saint-Jean region of Quebec, Canada. The seat is Alma. In 2016, 99.3% reported that they spoke French most often at home, according to the census.

Subdivisions
There are 18 subdivisions within the RCM:

Cities & Towns (3)
 Alma
 Desbiens
 Métabetchouan–Lac-à-la-Croix

Municipalities (9)
 Hébertville
 Labrecque
 Lamarche
 Saint-Bruno
 Sainte-Monique
 Saint-Gédéon
 Saint-Henri-de-Taillon
 Saint-Ludger-de-Milot
 Saint-Nazaire

Parishes (1)
 L'Ascension-de-Notre-Seigneur

Villages (1)
 Hébertville-Station

Unorganized territory (4)
 Belle-Rivière
 Lac-Achouakan
 Lac-Moncouche
 Mont-Apica

Demographics

Population

Language

Transportation

Access Routes
Highways and numbered routes that run through the municipality, including external routes that start or finish at the county border:

Autoroutes
 None

Principal Highways
 
 
 

Secondary Highways
 None

External Routes
 None

See also
 List of regional county municipalities and equivalent territories in Quebec

References

 
Census divisions of Quebec
Alma, Quebec